The Swedish 1-m Solar Telescope (or SST) is a refracting solar telescope at Roque de los Muchachos Observatory, La Palma in the Canary Islands. It is run by the Institute for Solar Physics of Stockholm University. The primary element is a single fused silica lens, making it the second largest optical refracting telescope in use in the world. The 110-cm lens has a clear aperture diameter of 98 cm. The SST is most often used as a Schupmann telescope, thereby correcting the chromatic aberrations of the singlet primary.

The SST is a vacuum telescope, meaning that it is evacuated internally to avoid disruption of the image from air inside. This is a particular problem with solar telescopes because of the heating from the large amounts of light collected being passed on to any air causing image degradation.

As of 2005 the SST has produced the highest resolution images on the Sun of any telescope. This is largely thanks to its adaptive optics system, which was upgraded to an 85-electrode monomorph deformable mirror from CILAS in 2013.

There are two modes of operation, selected by switching the beam from one optical table to another. One mode is a spectrograph mode, using the TRIPPEL spectrograph. The other mode is an imaging mode, where the beam is split up in a red and a blue part by a 500-nm dichroic beamsplitter. Both beams have dual Fabry-Pérot-based tunable filters, CRISP in the red and CHROMIS in the blue. The image data are usually compensated for residual wavefront aberrations by use of the MOMFBD image reconstruction method.

The SST superseded the SVST – the Swedish Vacuum Solar Telescope – which was 47,5 cm in diameter.

Instruments

CHROMIS

The CHROMospheric Imaging Spectrometer (CHROMIS) was installed in 2016. It is similar to CRISP (but so far without polarimetry) and designed for use at wavelengths in the range 380–500 nm. In particular, CHROMIS is optimized for use in the Ca II H and K lines, which are formed in the upper chromosphere. The total system uses three 1920×1200-pixel Grasshopper 3 CMOS cameras from Point Grey (now FLIR). One camera is used for direct narrow-band observations and two, in a phase-diversity configuration, are collecting simultaneous wide-band image data.

CRISP

The CRisp Imaging SpectroPolarimeter (CRISP) was installed in 2008. It operates from 510 to 860 nm and is able to measure polarization by using liquid crystal modulation combined with a polarizing beam splitter. The total system uses three 1k × 1k Sarnoff CCDs, two are used for direct narrow-band observations and the third is collecting simultaneous wide-band images.

TRIPPEL

The TRI-Port Polarimetric Echelle-Littrow  (TRIPPEL) is a Littrow spectrograph using a 79 grooves/mm echelle grating with a blaze angle of 63.43 degrees. TRIPPEL's wavelength range is about 380–1100 nm, and it has a moderate resolution for a solar telescope, with R being approximately 200,000. This corresponds to about 1.3 km/s on the solar surface.

TRIPPEL has a number of key useful features. It allows simultaneous observations at 3 different wavelengths, can in principle exploit the full spatial resolution of the SST, and has good polarimetric properties.

See also

 List of solar telescopes
 Dutch Open Telescope

References

External links 
 Information on the SST from the Institute for Solar Physics
 Information on the SST at the Institute for Solar Physics wiki
 SST APOD pictures of a sunspot, the Venus transit, spicules on the solar surface, and bright points in the solar granulation.
 APOD picture of the Roque de los Muchachos Observatory. The SST is the third from the right.

Astronomical observatories in La Palma
Solar telescopes